Fatou Babou Diagne (born 20 January 1996) is a Senegalese basketball player for the Purdue Boilermakers and the Senegalese national team.

She represented Senegal at the 2019 Women's Afrobasket.

References

1996 births
Living people
Centers (basketball)
Sportspeople from Thiès
Purdue Boilermakers women's basketball players
Senegalese expatriate basketball people in the United States
Senegalese women's basketball players